Hollar Hosiery Mills-Knit Sox Knitting Mills is a historic knitting mill located at Hickory, Catawba County, North Carolina.  It consists of two mill brick manufacturing buildings and a boiler house that were connected by a hyphen in the mid-1960s. The first mill building was built about 1930, and is a one- to two-story, 16 bay, brick veneer structure.  The boiler house was also built about 1930, and is a small, brick building, with its flat roof and terra cotta coping.  The hosiery yarn mill was built about 1940, and is two-story, six bay by 10 bay, brick-veneered building.  Both mill buildings feature banks of steel-sash factory windows. The knitting mill operated until 1968.

It was listed on the National Register of Historic Places in 2012.

References

Industrial buildings and structures on the National Register of Historic Places in North Carolina
Industrial buildings completed in 1930
Buildings and structures in Catawba County, North Carolina
National Register of Historic Places in Catawba County, North Carolina